Scott Mitchell Rosenberg is an American film, television, and comic book producer. He is the chairman of Platinum Studios, an entertainment company that controls a library of comic-book characters and adapts them for film, television and other media. Through Platinum Studios he is affiliated with Moving Pictures Media Group. He is also the  founder and former president of Malibu Comics, and is a former senior executive vice president for Marvel Comics.

As a producer with Platinum Studios, Rosenberg has released films and television programming with Universal Studios, Paramount Pictures, DreamWorks, MGM, Showtime, and Lions Gate Entertainment. He has also developed film and television with several others including The Walt Disney Company, Time-Warner’s New Line Films, 20th Century Fox and Sony Pictures Entertainment.

Biography

Early career
Rosenberg began his career in the comic-book industry at age 13 when he started a mail order company called Direct Comics. 

Rosenberg graduated from the University of Denver.

Sunrise Distribution and Malibu Comics 

In the mid-1980s, Rosenberg was running the small Commerce, California-based comics distributor Sunrise Distribution. In 1986, income from his distribution business allowed Rosenberg to privately finance a number of independent comics publishers, including Eternity Comics and Malibu Comics. Eternity's first launch, Ex-Mutants, as Rosenberg once said in an interview, "turned out to be a hit" and "all on a $400 marketing budget." 

Sunrise began to suffer cash-flow issues in the spring of 1987. At the same time, Rosenberg personally took over his various publishers, shutting most of them down and folding Eternity into Malibu as its primary imprint. 

In the summer of 1998, during the "black-and-white implosion,"  Sunrise abruptly folded and went out of business. This left a number of small publishers without the cash flow to continue, and they, too, went out of business. Rosenberg turned his focus to Malibu Comics.

During his time at Malibu, Rosenberg led comic spin-offs into toys, television, and feature films, including the billion-dollar film and television franchise Men in Black, based on the Marvel/Malibu comic The Men in Black by Lowell Cunningham. He also acquired a number of other independent publishers, including Aircel Comics and Adventure Comics, also folding them into Malibu.

In 1992, Rosenberg brokered a deal in which seven top-selling artists defected from Marvel Comics to form Image Comics. Rosenberg signed the artists to a label deal which made Malibu the publisher of record for the first comics from Image, giving the upstart creator-run publisher access to the distribution channels. This subsequently led to Rosenberg and his Malibu Comics breaking all sales records for independent comics; in 1992 Malibu grabbed almost 10% of the American comics market share, temporarily moving ahead of industry giant DC Comics. By the middle of 1993, Image's financial situation was secure enough to publish its titles independently, and per the agreed upon distribution agreement with Malibu, ventured out on its own.

During this period, Rosenberg also worked with Adobe Photoshop software to develop the then-leading standard for the computer coloring of comic books.

Rosenberg sold Malibu to Marvel Comics in 1994. As part of the deal, Rosenberg was given the title senior executive vice president of Marvel.

Platinum Studios
Rosenberg left Marvel in January 1997, and purchased half of Platinum Studios from European rights agent Ervin Rustemagić. Platinum produces based on two distinctive categories: Those from the "Macroverse Bible," a multi-thousand-page bible of related comic characters created by Rosenberg, including titles such as Cowboys & Aliens, and properties acquired from other companies or creators such as Dylan Dog: Dead of Night and Jeremiah. Rustemagić left Platinum Studios in 2000. The company’s comic publishing philosophy is for the original publishers or rights holders to continue publishing their comics with Platinum Studios handling all other rights and development. Comics have been published based on Platinum’s properties continuously since inception, whether by Platinum itself or the original rights holders. Film productions in 2009–2011 were Cowboys & Aliens and Dylan Dog.

Platinum Studios posted net losses of $4.3 million in 2006 and $5.1 million in 2007, and grew to a revenue of $10.5 million. The company became a public company, trading continuously since February 2008.

In early 2012, Platinum Studios moved to new offices in West Los Angeles. In 2014, 27 million shares of Platinum were acquired by KCG Holdings.

Filmography

Producer
 Ultraforce (1995)
 Men in Black (1997) (Special Thanks)
 Night Man (1997)
 Jeremiah (2002–2004)
 Dylan Dog: Dead of Night (2011)
 Cowboys & Aliens (2011)

References

External links

"Scott Mitchell Rosenberg: Chairman and Chief Executive Officer" biography at Platinum Studios official site. Archived from the original on November 5, 2015.

Living people
American film producers
American television producers
Place of birth missing (living people)
Year of birth missing (living people)
Comic book publishers (people)
University of Denver alumni